Christopher Ray Bourque (born January 29, 1986) is an American former professional ice hockey forward. Originally drafted by the Washington Capitals of the National Hockey League (NHL), he has played 51 NHL games for the Capitals, the Pittsburgh Penguins and the Boston Bruins.

Playing career
Bourque was born in Boston but grew up in Topsfield, Massachusetts, and graduated from Cushing Academy in 2004. While there, he was close friends with Keith Yandle. He played college hockey in the NCAA during the 2004-2005 season for the Boston University Terriers. He was drafted 33rd overall in the 2004 NHL Entry Draft by the Washington Capitals, and played for the Portland Pirates and Hershey Bears of the American Hockey League (AHL) before being called up to the NHL in November 2007. He played four NHL games total before being reassigned to Hershey in February 2008.

Bourque scored his first NHL goal on December 30, 2008, against the Buffalo Sabres. In the 2009–10 season, he was claimed off of waivers by the Pittsburgh Penguins on September 30, 2009, and recorded his first NHL assist on October 28, 2009 in a 6–1 win over the Montreal Canadiens. On December 5, 2009, he was waived by the Penguins and re-claimed by his former team, the Washington Capitals. He was then assigned back to the Bears where he remained for the majority of the season. In helping the Bears capture their second successive Calder Cup, Bourque led the league in scoring with 27 post-season points to win the Jack A. Butterfield Trophy as Calder Cup Playoff MVP in 2010.

In mid-July 2010, Bourque failed to sign the qualifying offer extended by Washington and signed to play with Atlant Moscow Oblast of the Kontinental Hockey League (KHL) for the 2010–11 season. Bourque had earlier signed a two-year contract with the team, worth US$1 Million per year, but the contract was not binding until July 15, 2010. After a disappointing start with Atlant Moscow Oblast, Bourque left the team on October 3, 2010.

On October 4, 2010, Swiss hockey club HC Lugano announced they had signed Bourque to a contract.

Bourque returned to re-sign with the Capitals on a one-year contract on July 2, 2011. In the 2011–12 season, Bourque was assigned by the Capitals to the Hershey Bears and led the league in scoring with a career-high 93 points in 73 games. On May 26, 2012, Bourque was traded by the Capitals to the Boston Bruins for forward Zach Hamill. Chris scored the only goal, his first as a Bruin, in a February 2, 2013 1–0 road game against the Toronto Maple Leafs.

On June 18, 2013, having become a free agent, Bourque returned to the KHL, signing a one-year deal with Ak Bars Kazan. After only 11 games, Bourque mirrored his previous short-lived stint in the KHL, transferring to Swiss club EHC Biel for the remainder of the season.

On July 1, 2014, Bourque made another return to the NHL, in signing a one-year two way contract with the New York Rangers. Assigned to their AHL affiliate, the Hartford Wolf Pack for the 2014–15 season, Bourque led the team in scoring with 66 points in 73 games and was selected to the AHL first All-Star team.

On July 2, 2015, Bourque signed a two-year, two-way contract with the Washington Capitals. Assigned to the Hershey Bears for the 2015–16 season, Bourque led his team in scoring once again with 80 points in 72 games and was selected to his third AHL first All-Star team. On April 15, 2016, Bourque was announced as the winner of the AHL's winner of Most Valuable Player for the 2015–16 season. Bourque was a key part of Hershey's playoff run, who ultimately lost the Calder Cup Finals to the Lake Erie Monsters.

Bourque continued his long-tenured partnership with the Bears at the conclusion of his two-year deal with the Capitals, agreeing to an optional two-year deal with Hershey on June 20, 2017.

After completing his eighth season with the Bears in 2017–18, Bourque left as a free agent and as the AHL's active career leading scorer. Reuniting with his brother, Ryan, he signed a one-year deal with the Bridgeport Sound Tigers, affiliate of the New York Islanders, on July 9, 2018.

Following his lone season with the Sound Tigers in the 2018–19 season, Bourque as a free agent opted to return abroad for the first time in 5 years, agreeing to a one-year contract with German club, EHC München of the Deutsche Eishockey Liga (DEL), on May 27, 2019. He enjoyed three years in the DEL, finishing his tenure in Germany with ERC Ingolstadt in the 2021–22 season.

On April 30, 2022, Bourque announced his retirement from professional hockey after 17 seasons. It was later announced by the Hershey Bears that having played in nine seasons with the club, his #17 jersey would retired on January 14, 2023.

International play

On January 1, 2018, it was announced that Bourque was selected to play for the United States at the 2018 Winter Olympics. He registered 2 assists in 5 games as the United States finished the tournament in seventh place.

Personal life
Bourque is the son of Hockey Hall of Famer Ray Bourque and his wife Christianne. His younger brother, Ryan, also played in the Washington Capitals system and in the NHL for the New York Rangers. He also has an older sister, Melissa.

Bourque married his longtime girlfriend Kimberly McManus, in July 2011. The couple have a son and a daughter together.

Career statistics

Regular season and playoffs

International

Awards and honors

References

External links

1986 births
Living people
Ak Bars Kazan players
American men's ice hockey left wingers
American people of French-Canadian descent
Boston Bruins players
Boston University Terriers men's ice hockey players
Bridgeport Sound Tigers players
EHC Biel players
ERC Ingolstadt players
Hartford Wolf Pack players
Atlant Moscow Oblast players
HC Lugano players
Hershey Bears players
Sportspeople from Essex County, Massachusetts
Ice hockey players from Massachusetts
Ice hockey players at the 2018 Winter Olympics
Olympic ice hockey players of the United States
EHC München players
People from Topsfield, Massachusetts
Pittsburgh Penguins players
Portland Pirates players
Providence Bruins players
Washington Capitals draft picks
Washington Capitals players